Jean Capelle may refer to:
 Jean Capelle (footballer) (1913–1977), Belgian footballer
 Jean Capelle (athlete) (died 1962), French athlete in the marathon
 Jean Capelle (politician) (1909–1983), French politician